The Men's 1500 metres competition at the 2019 World Single Distances Speed Skating Championships was held on 10 February 2019.

Results
The race was started at 15:25.

References

Men's 1500 metres